Christianity has a long history in Kyrgyzstan, with the earliest archaeological remains of churches belonging to the Church of the East in modern-day Suyab dating back to the 7th century. By the 9th century an archdiocese of the Church of the East cared for the Christians of Kyrgyzstan and adjacent areas in eastern Turkestan. Although primarily Turkic there was also an Armenian community in what today is Kyrgyzstan by the 14th century. By the 15th century, however, there were no longer ecclesiastical structures of any church caring for what is today Kyrgyzstan and Islam gained the ascendancy amongst the Kyrgyz people.

Today Eastern Orthodox Christianity is the largest Christian denomination in Kyrgyzstan, with between 700,000 and 1.1 million followers primarily comprising the country's ethnic Russians and Ukrainians. A small minority of ethnic Germans are also Christian, mostly Lutheran and Anabaptist, with a Roman Catholic community of approximately 1,500. A 2015 study estimates some 19,000 Christians from a Muslim background residing in the country, though not all are necessarily citizens of Kyrgyzstan. While other scholars estimated the total number of Muslim Kyrgyz converts to Christianity between 25,000 to 50,000, although the government disputes that figure. Exact numbers of Muslim Kyrgyz converts to Christianity vary but an estimate of around 20,000 is generally accepted among scholars.

Orthodox Christian Church 
The modern history of Orthodoxy in Kyrgyzstan dates back to the country's incorporation into the Russian Empire in the late 19th century. The first parishes in Kyrgyzstan were opened in Bishkek, Naryn, and Osh in the 1870s to serve the Russian forts being built in the country. The military parishes were eventually recognized as regular parishes as the Russian Orthodox Church presence in Kyrgyzstan grew. In 1871 the Holy Synod of the Russian Orthodox Church established a diocese - the Eparchy of Tashkent and Turkestan - for its new communities in Central Asia, with the new parishes in Kyrgyzstan coming under its authority. By the time of the Russian Revolution in 1917 there were over 30 churches in what today is Kyrgyzstan. It was also home to one of three Orthodox monasteries in Central Asia at the time, Holy Trinity Monastery on the shores of Lake Issyk Kul.

During the Soviet era Orthodoxy in Kyrgyzstan suffered from persecution as it did elsewhere in the USSR. Clergy and laity alike were murdered by the new authorities and many churches were closed and destroyed. As part of the easing of the persecutions during World War II many churches were reopened, with thirty-two active in Kyrgyzstan by 1946. Eight were later closed in the renewed persecutions under Khrushchev.

Since the collapse of the Soviet Union the number of Orthodox parishes in Kyrgyzstan has nearly doubled to forty-four. A new women's monastery has also been established in Kara-Balta in northern Kyrgyzstan. In 2011 the Holy Synod of the Russian Orthodox Church decided to separate the Orthodox Church in Kyrgyzstan from the Eparchy of Tashkent and establish it as its own diocese, the Eparchy of Bishkek under the Bishop of Bishkek and Kyrgyzstan. The new diocese was included in the Russian Orthodox Church's Ecclesiastical province of Central Asia.

Roman Catholic Church

The Catholics are mentioned in this region since 14th century, mainly on the territory of today’s Kazakhstan. The Roman Catholic missionaries came in Kyrgyzstan mainly from China, till turn of 19th and 20th centuries. Since 1918 to 1930, the area of Kyrgyzstan came under the parish of Tashkent. In 1937, there started the persecution of Roman Catholic Church, the churches were destroyed and all priests were deported or executed. In that time, because of mass deportations into Central Asia (that had no parallel even in tsar era), came to influx of Catholics from Volga area, Ukraine, Poland and Baltic Sea area.
On 13 May 1991, there was created apostolic administration of Kazakhstan and Central Asia that included five post-Soviet Central Asian republics, from which four gained a status of mission sui iuris later – church in Kyrgyzstan on 22 December 1997. Status sui iuris means that it is an autonomous unit – independent juristic person, based on own discipline, heritage, or culture, but it is always dependent on Roman pope.

In Kyrgyzstan, there were 268 Christians in 1999. Part of them were descendants of German, Polish, Latvian and Lithuanian deportees and part are citizens of other states (diplomats, workers of international organisations).

On the other hand, it is necessary to mention that for the whole time of existence of the Catholic Church in Bishkek (it was officially registered already in 1969), there took place no one christening of any Kyrgyz.

On 18 March 2006, there was found the apostolic administration in Kyrgyzstan (region under administration of any clergyman authorised by pope), now under administration of bishop Nicolas Messmer, which was born (similarly as his predecessor in the administration of Kyrgyzstan Alexander Kan) in Kazakhs Karaghanda. The relationship to Kazakhs bishopric was always very strong; also the Catholic literature or songbooks are printed in Kazakhstan.

In the capitol Bishkek, there is a church (among the associated societies belong e.g. Belovodskoe, Chaldybar, Tuz, Nurmanbet, Ivanovka, Iskra, Niznevostochnoe, Kamyshanovka, Oktjabrskoe), the worships in Talas take place in a bought house, newly was found the parish on the south of Kyrgyzstan (Djalalabad and Osh) too and another parish is in Karakol.

In Bishkek, up to now, the Roman Catholic Church is connected with German population and therefore also the church uses to be marked as “German” by the Kyrgyz (немецкая церковь) – in contrary to Orthodox church that is “Russian” (русская церковь). Among the visitors of the church are (except the foreigners) really such a Bishkek citizens that have German origin (although they do not speak German) and next, there are here also descendants of Poles.

See also 

Religion in Kyrgyzstan
Roman Catholicism in Kyrgyzstan
Bible translations into Kyrgyz

References

External links 
Bible in Kyrgyz language
Nestorianism among Kirghiz tribes